Martin Jones may refer to:

Martin Jones (ice hockey) (born 1990), Canadian ice hockey goaltender 
Martin Jones (pianist) (born 1940), English concert pianist
Martin Furnival Jones (1913–1997), Director General of MI5, the United Kingdom's internal security service, 1965–1972
Martin Jones (cricketer) (born 1985), English cricketer
Martin Jones (runner) (born 1967), British runner
Ruth Martin-Jones (born 1947), British long jumper and heptathlete

See also
Marty Jones (born 1953), English professional wrestler
Martyn Jones (disambiguation)